SITE Super Highway Phase-I is located on Super Highway Karachi.

See also 
 Korangi
 Korangi Town
 Korangi Creek Cantonment
 Korangi Creek Industrial Park
 Studio 146

External links
 

1987 establishments in Pakistan
Korangi Town